Vere Street is a street off Oxford Street, in central London.  It is a continuation of Welbeck Street, and part of the B406. It is named after a family name of the area's owners at the time of its construction, the Earls of Oxford.  It is best known for the Marybone Chapel, also known as the Marylebone Chapel or Oxford Chapel, now St Peter's Vere Street.  The sculptor John Michael Rysbrack lived and died here in 1770.

The Consular Section of the Embassy of Brazil is located at nos. 3–4.

The nearest underground station is Bond Street to the south-west.

See also
 List of eponymous roads in London

References

External links 
 LondonTown.com information

Streets in the City of Westminster